Philip Gallagher (born 1955?) is a former Australian rules footballer who played for the Norwood Football Club in the South Australian National Football League (SANFL).

He is the son of Sam Gallagher, who also represented Norwood.

Outside of football, Gallagher worked as a chartered accountant. After retiring as a player, he served as a League director and club chairman of Norwood from 1996 to 1999.

Gallagher became a member of the South Australian Football Commission in 2000 and currently serves as the Commission's Deputy Chairman.

References

External links

Living people
Year of birth uncertain
Norwood Football Club players
Place of birth missing (living people)
Year of birth missing (living people)